Ravikant Singh (born 18 March 1994) is an Indian cricketer. He made his List A debut for Bengal in 2012. He made his Twenty20 debut on 18 November 2019, for Bengal in the 2019–20 Syed Mushtaq Ali Trophy.

See also
 List of Bengal cricketers

References

External links
 

1994 births
Living people
Indian cricketers
Bengal cricketers
Cricketers from Kolkata